Zora Young (born January 21, 1948, West Point, Mississippi, United States) is an American blues singer. She is distantly related to Howlin' Wolf.

Young's family moved to Chicago when she was seven. She began singing gospel music at the Greater Harvest Baptist Church. As an adult she began singing blues and R&B. Over the course of her career, she has performed with Junior Wells, Jimmy Dawkins, Bobby Rush, Buddy Guy, Albert King, Professor Eddie Lusk, and B. B. King. Among those she has collaborated with on record are Willie Dixon, Sunnyland Slim, Mississippi Heat, Paul DeLay, and Maurice John Vaughn.

In 1982, she toured Europe with Bonnie Lee and Big Time Sarah, billed as "Blues with the Girls", and recorded an album in Paris. She was later cast in the role of Bessie Smith in the stage  show The Heart of the Blues. By 1991 she had recorded the album Travelin' Light, with the Canadian guitarist Colin Linden.

Young has toured Europe more than thirty times and has made appearances in Turkey and Taiwan. She was the featured performer at the Chicago Blues Festival six times.

In 2014, she was nominated for a Blues Music Award in the category 'Traditional Blues Female' (known as the Koko Taylor Award). Her latest album, Friday Night (2016), featured Little Mike and the Tornadoes.

Discography
Travelin' Light (Deluge Records, 1992)
Learned My Lesson (Delmark Records, 2000)
Tore Up from the Floor Up (Delmark, 2005)
Sunnyland (Airway, 2009)
The French Connection (Delmark, 2009)
Friday Night (Elrob Records, 2016)

References

1948 births
Living people
American blues singers
Gospel blues musicians
Singers from Mississippi
American women singers
Soul-blues musicians
Blues musicians from Mississippi
People from West Point, Mississippi
21st-century American women